Hon. James Michael Edward Bruce  (26 August 1927 – 22 April 2013), was a Scottish farmer, forester, and the founding chairman of Scottish Woodlands.

Early life
James Bruce was born in August 1927 in Fife, the fourth child and second son of Edward Bruce, 10th Earl of Elgin. He was educated at Eton and the Royal Military College, Sandhurst, and served in the Scots Guards. He studied agriculture at the Royal Agricultural College, Cirencester, where he won the Goldstand Medal.

Personal life
In 1950, Bruce married (Margaret) Jean Coats at Glen Tanar, Aboyne, the daughter of Thomas Coats, 2nd Baron Glentanar. They divorced in 1974. In 1975, he married Morven-Anne Macdonald, who died in 1994, and in 2000 married Mary Elizabeth Hamilton. He had seven children.

Bruce lived at Balmanno Castle from the 1950s.

References

1927 births
2013 deaths
People educated at Eton College
Scots Guards officers
20th-century Scottish farmers
Scottish foresters
Commanders of the Order of the British Empire
English justices of the peace
Alumni of the Royal Agricultural University
Graduates of the Royal Military College, Sandhurst
Younger sons of earls
James